Dominican Creole French is a French-based creole, which is a widely spoken language in Dominica. It can be considered a distinct dialect of Antillean Creole.

History
It is a sub-variety of Antillean Creole, which is spoken in other islands of the Lesser Antilles and is very closely related to the varieties spoken in Martinique, Guadeloupe, Saint Lucia, Grenada and parts of Trinidad and Tobago. The intelligibility rate with speakers of other varieties of Antillean Creole is almost 100%. Its syntactic, grammatical and lexical features are virtually identical to that of Martinican Creole, though, like its Saint Lucian counterpart, it includes more English loanwords than the Martinican variety. People who speak Haitian Creole can also understand Dominican Creole French, even though there are a number of distinctive features; they are mutually intelligible.

Like the other French-based creole languages in the Caribbean, Dominican French Creole is primarily French-derived vocabulary, with African and Carib influences to its syntax. In addition, many expressions reflect the presence of an English Creole and Spanish influences are also very much present in the language.

In 1635, the French seized Guadeloupe and Martinique and began establishing sugar colonies. Dominica, for its part, had not been colonized because all attempts to colonize it had failed. Before 1690, lumberjacks (English and French) had traveled to Dominica for its forest resources.  Subsequently, French from Martinique and Guadeloupe and their slaves settled in Dominica by establishing small farms of coffee, cotton, wood, and tobacco. Creole thus develops among the slaves, Dominican Creole thus comes from the mixture of the Creoles from Guadeloupe and Martinique, and then it is enriched further with Amerindian and English words.  From now on, the Creole would stay until the present. Despite the future transfer of the island to the English and the addition of English words, the Creole remains strongly French in Dominica and despite what is said, is his place in the center of the Dominicans culture. The underdevelopment of the road system in Dominica hindered for a long time the development of English, the official language of the country, in isolated villages, where Creole remained the only spoken language.

Kwéyòl pronouns

Kwéyòl alphabet

Articles 
Definite articles comes after the noun in Creole, unlike in French where they always precede the noun. "La" follows nouns that end with a consonant or "y". When a noun ends with a vowel, it is followed by "a" only.

Numbers

Cardinal 

 1 000 000 = yon milyon
 1 000 000 000 = yon milya
 1 234 = yon mil + dé san + twantkat
 30 153 = twant mil + san + senkantwa
 412 489 = (kat san douz) mil + kat san + katwèvennèf
 12 356 734 = (douz) milyon + (twa san+senkantsis) mil + sèt san+twantkat

Ordinal 
1st = pwémyè
2nd = dézyènm
3rd = twazyènm
4th = katriyènm
5th = senkyènm
6th = sizyènm (Notice the second "s" in "sis" is pronounced as a "z")
7th = sètyènm
8th = wityènm
9th = nèvyènm (Notice the "f" in "nèf" is pronounced as a "v")
All the other numbers are formed like this: Number +  [yènm]

See also

Antillean Creole
Grenadian Creole French
Saint Lucian Creole French
Haitian Creole
World Creole Music Festival

References

French-based pidgins and creoles
Languages of Dominica
French language in the Americas
Creoles of the Caribbean